HMAS Paterson (FY. 109) was a wooden auxiliary minesweeper operated by the Royal Australian Navy (RAN) during World War II. She was built in 1919-20 by T.F. Morrison, Sinclair & Company at Balmain. The ship operated as a coastal steamer and was requisitioned by the RAN in 1941. She was returned to her owners on 26 November 1945 before sinking near The Entrance, New South Wales on 11 June 1951.

Operational history

Paterson was requisitioned by the RAN for use as an auxiliary and commissioned on 1 May 1941. She was returned to her owners in 1947. She was beached off Norah Head on 17 November 1947, after springing a leak and was later refloated. On 11 June 1951, Paterson was wrecked after sinking again off The Entrance.

Citations

References
 http://www.navyhistory.org.au/1-may-1941/

1919 ships
Minesweepers of the Royal Australian Navy
Shipwrecks of the Central Coast Region
Interwar period ships of Australia
Coastal trading vessels of Australia
Iron and steel steamships of Australia